Millikin may refer to:

People

Surname
Anna Millikin (1764 – ), teacher and author
Earl Millikin (1890–1970), the Mayor of Seattle, Washington 1941–1942
Eric Millikin, American contemporary artist and activist based in Detroit, Michigan
Eugene Millikin (1891–1958), United States Senator from Colorado
Hugh Millikin (born 1957), Australian curler originally from Ottawa, Ontario
James Millikin (1827–1909), the founder of Millikin University in Decatur, Illinois
John M. Millikin (1804–1884), Republican politician in the state of Ohio
John Millikin (1888–1970), senior United States Army officer during World War II

Given name
James Millikin Bevans, Major General in the United States Air Force
Charlotte Millikin Hoak (1874–1967), teacher, horticulturist, botanist, garden columnist in Southern California

Other
Millikin University, American co-educational comprehensive private university in Decatur, Illinois, United States
Millikin Big Blue, the intercollegiate athletic programs of Millikin University

See also
James Millikin House, a historic house in Decatur, Illinois
Milik
Milki
Millikan (disambiguation)
Milliken (disambiguation)
Milliskin